Gornji Ivanjci is a dispersed settlement in the hills southwest of Gornja Radgona in northeastern Slovenia. A triangular column shrine from the 19th century and a villa from c. 1900 stand in the village.

References

External links

Gornji Ivanjci on Geopedia

Populated places in the Municipality of Gornja Radgona